Superman & Lois is an American superhero drama television series developed for The CW by Todd Helbing and Greg Berlanti, based on the DC Comics characters Superman and Lois Lane, created by Jerry Siegel and Joe Shuster. Tyler Hoechlin and Elizabeth Tulloch star as the title characters Clark Kent / Superman, Earth's greatest superhero, and Lois Lane, a world-renowned journalist. Jordan Elsass and Alex Garfin portray the couple's twin sons Jonathan and Jordan Kent. The series also stars Erik Valdez, Inde Navarrette, Wolé Parks, Adam Rayner, Dylan Walsh, Emmanuelle Chriqui, Tayler Buck, and Sofia Hasmik.

The series was intended to be part of the Arrowverse in its first season, but as the series went on, showrunner Todd Helbing and Warner Bros. decided to keep the show separate, with the series instead set on an alternate Earth that is different from Earth-Prime. This was confirmed in the second season finale.

Superman & Lois was announced as a pilot in October 2019 and was ordered to series in January 2020. The series premiered on The CW on February 23, 2021. In March 2022, the series was renewed for a third season which premiered on March 14, 2023.

Premise
In the first season, Clark Kent / Superman and Lois Lane return to Smallville with their sons Jonathan and Jordan, where they are reacquainted with Lana Lang, her husband Kyle Cushing, and their daughter Sarah. Their idyllic lives are upended when The Stranger enters as well as by the secret experiments of Morgan Edge.

During the second season, Superman's painful visions lead him to an encounter with Bizarro while also butting heads with Lt. General Mitch Anderson. In addition, Lois deals with the Inverse Method cult led by Ally Allston who swayed Lucy Lane to her side and has made an enemy of Bizarro for her supposed conquering of his world.

Cast and characters

 Tyler Hoechlin as Kal-El / Clark Kent / Superman: a superhero from Krypton and husband of Lois who defends Earth. Dylan Kingwell portrays a teenage Clark in season one, Josh Zaharia portrays a teenager Clark in season two, Lennix James portrays a four-year-old Clark, Thomas Hoeving portrays Clark in his childhood, and Parker Cousineau portrays Clark in grade school.
 Elizabeth Tulloch as Lois Lane: a world-renowned journalist and wife of Clark.
 Jordan Elsass (seasons 1–2) and Michael Bishop (season 3) as Jonathan Kent: the modest, kind-hearted and athletic son of Clark and Lois who unlike Jordan did not inherit any kryptonian superpowers. He is named after Clark's adoptive father, Jonathan Kent. Elsass departed the series prior to the third season due to personal issues, and the role was recast to Michael Bishop. Brady Droulis portrays a seven-year-old Jonathan Kent.
 Alex Garfin as Jordan Kent: the introspective son of Clark and Lois, who is an outcast with social anxiety. Unlike Jonathan, Jordan has inherited their father's powers, though early in Season 1 his abilities only appear in "small bursts" but he manifests more powers and in Season 2 he has grown powerful enough to fight Tal-Rho for a brief time. He is named after Clark's biological father, Jor-El. Dawson Littman portrays a seven-year-old Jordan Kent.
 Erik Valdez as Kyle Cushing: ex-husband of Lana Lang and Smallville's fire chief. Callous and abrasive, who is struggling with alcoholism, he carries a chip on his shoulder about living in a small town.  An honest conservative who has faith in family and a strong sense of duty for those that matter  close to him.  He believes being able to support yourself and not relying on others is important, for better or worse.
 Inde Navarrette as Sarah Cortez: Kyle and Lana's "wild child" daughter who befriends the Kent boys and serves as Jordan's love interest. In Season 2 episode "Girl…You’ll Be A Woman, Soon" she celebrates her quinceañera and changes her name to Cortez, which was her family's name before they changed it, keeping her previous surname of Cushing as a middle name.
 Wolé Parks as John Henry Irons / The Stranger: a soldier from an unidentified parallel Earth who is hellbent on proving to the world that it no longer needs Superman. He eventually accepts Superman as the savior of Earth and teams up with him to protect people from Morgan Edge.
 Adam Rayner as Tal-Rho / Morgan Edge / Eradicator (main: season 1; recurring: season 2): "an intelligent, eloquent, and impassioned self-made mogul whose innate ability to motivate is the means to his success and others’ demise.” He is later revealed to be Kal-El's half-brother known as Tal-Rho through Kal’s mother Lara Lor-Van and Zeta-Rho with plans to restore the Kryptonian race. Jack Rehbein and Ben Cockell portray a 10-year-old Tal-Rho and a 19-year-old Tal-Rho, respectively.
 Dylan Walsh as Sam Lane: father of Lois and grandfather of Jonathan and Jordan, a no-nonsense, workaholic Army general who is determined to keep America and the world safe from all threats.
 Emmanuelle Chriqui as Lana Lang: an old friend of Clark Kent and the former loan officer at Smallville Bank. In season two she becomes the new Mayor of Smallville. Milano Hryshchenko portrays a childhood Lana, Sara Rizk portrays a grade school Lana, and Emma Newton portrays a teenage Lana.
 Tayler Buck as Natalie Lane Irons (main: season 2-present; guest: season 1): John Henry Irons's daughter from his Earth with an alternate version of Lois Lane.
 Sofia Hasmik as Chrissy Beppo (main: season 2-present; recurring: season 1): a "go-getter" journalist at the Smallville Gazette who has a "chance encounter" that changes her life.
 Chad L. Coleman as Bruno Mannheim (season 3)

Episodes

Series overview

Season 1 (2021)

Season 2 (2022)

Season 3 (2023)

Production

Development
The series was announced in October 2019 and executive produced by Todd Helbing, Greg Berlanti, Sarah Schechter and Geoff Johns with Helbing penning the script for the series. On January 14, 2020, The CW officially ordered Superman & Lois to series. The first season consisted of 15 episodes. The series Everwood and Friday Night Lights served as inspirations for the series, given they were also family dramas. Helbing explained many aspects of Superman & Lois were approached as if it were a feature film, such as the aspect ratio, cinematography, and production design, saying "We are competing with shows on cable and streamers…we wanted to be able to do that and offer audiences something of equal quality". On March 2, 2021, The CW renewed the series for a second season which premiered on January 11, 2022. On March 22, 2022, The CW renewed the series for a third season. On January 31, 2023, DC Studios CEOs James Gunn and Peter Safran said there are plans for Superman & Lois to have "one to two more seasons".

Casting
Tyler Hoechlin and Elizabeth Tulloch were signed on to reprise their roles as Clark Kent and Lois Lane from Supergirl. In February 2020, Jordan Elsass and Alexander Garfin were cast as Clark and Lois' sons Jonathan Kent and Jordan Kent, respectively. In April, Dylan Walsh was cast as Samuel Lane. Walsh replaces Glenn Morshower, who previously recurred in the role on Supergirl. Emmanuelle Chriqui was also cast as Lana Lang, along with Erik Valdez as Kyle Cushing. The next month, Wolé Parks was cast as "The Stranger" while Inde Navarrette was cast as Sarah Cushing. Additionally, Adam Rayner portrays Morgan Edge, who was previously portrayed by Adrian Pasdar in Supergirl.

In October 2020, Sofia Hasmik and Stacey Farber were cast in the recurring roles of Chrissy Beppo and Leslie Larr, respectively. In December 2020, David Ramsey was revealed to be reprising his Arrow role of John Diggle in addition to directing at least one episode in the series. In June 2021, Hasmik was promoted to a series regular for the second season. In August 2021, Tayler Buck, who guest starred in the first season, was promoted to a series regular for the second season. In October 2021, Ian Bohen was cast in a recurring role as Lt. Mitch Anderson for the second season. Jenna Dewan, who previously played Lucy Lane on Supergirl reprised her role in the second season.

In August 2022, Elsass departed the series ahead of the third season for personal reasons. The following month, his role was recast to Michael Bishop and Chad L. Coleman was cast as Bruno Mannheim. Lex Luthor will appear in the show where he is now portrayed by Michael Cudlitz instead of a reprisal from Jon Cryer, who played his doppleganger on Earth-Prime.

Filming
Production on the pilot was expected to begin on March 23, 2020, in Vancouver, British Columbia, and conclude on May 14. However, on March 13, 2020, plans to shoot a pilot were delayed due to the COVID-19 pandemic, to either June or July of that year. In late July 2020, Warner Bros. Television planned for the Vancouver-based production to restart in late August. Filming of season 1 began on October 21, 2020, and concluded on July 2, 2021. The series is filmed on location in Surrey, British Columbia. The second season began filming on September 15, 2021, and concluded on May 5, 2022. Filming of the third season began on September 6, 2022, in Vancouver, BC and concluded on March 14, 2023.

Writing
In November 2020, series writer Nadria Tucker announced she was fired from the show, claiming it was for "pushing back on racist and sexist storylines." She also claimed she worked on all 15 episodes of the first season, but was only paid for 13 of them. In a statement, WBTV claimed that "Warner Bros. Television did not exercise its option to extend her [contract] for additional episodes" and that "WBTV was transparent and told her why it was not picking up her option."

Connection to the Arrowverse
Speaking to the lack of greater Arrowverse connections in the first season, showrunner Todd Helbing felt that there was "this weird set of circumstances where, because of production or timing or COVID, everything in the show that was related to the Arrowverse has gotten pulled out". He added that, as development progressed further away from the "Crisis on Infinite Earths" crossover, "it felt like we were opening a can of worms every time we had to explain the connection", though he was hopeful more connections or proper crossovers could occur in the second season.

The second season finale established the series as taking place adjacent to Earth-Prime, with different iterations of the characters compared to their Earth-Prime counterparts and a different continuity. Helbing later revealed that the show was separate from Earth-Prime, a decision he and DC Entertainment made. He further added that the Superman and John Diggle in the show are doppelgangers of the ones on Earth-Prime.

Release

Broadcast
Superman & Lois premiered on The CW on February 23, 2021. After a delay in production caused by COVID-19, the series went on hiatus after the fifth episode, during which the sixth season of Supergirl took over the series' timeslot. The second season premiered on January 11, 2022. The third season premiered on March 14, 2023.

CTV Sci-Fi Channel airs the series in Canada. The BBC acquired the UK broadcast rights to the show. The series premiered on BBC One on December 4, 2021, and was made available to stream on BBC iPlayer.

Home media
Beginning March 5, 2021, extended versions of episodes of Superman & Lois started streaming on The CW's app and website a day after the release of an episode. The entire first season became available on HBO Max on September 17, 2021. The second season was made available on July 29, 2022.

Season one of the show was released on Blu-ray and DVD in the US on October 19, 2021. Season two was released on September 27, 2022.

Reception

Critical response
On Rotten Tomatoes, the first season has an approval rating of 86% based on 44 reviews, with an average rating of 7.6/10. The website's critical consensus reads "Though it may be a bit too grounded for some viewers, Superman & Lois draws strength from unexpected placeswithout skimping on the actionto carve its own path in a crowded superhero universe." On Metacritic, it has a weighted average score of 65 out of 100 based on 16 reviews, indicating "generally favorable reviews".

Ratings

Season 1

Season 2

Accolades

Comic book tie-ins
DC Comics published Earth-Prime, a six-issue comic event set entirely in the universe of DC's superhero shows. Each of the first five issues spotlight a different CW/DC superhero series, with the sixth issue serving as a crossover finale. The comic series is considered part of the superhero television shows' canon. Earth-Prime #2 features Superman & Lois, written by Adam Mallinger, Jai Jamison and Andrew Wong with art by Tom Grummett and Norm Rapmund and was released on April 19, 2022. The comic includes Clark/Superman and Lois trying to celebrate their first wedding anniversary, Clark remembering his father Jonathan on Father's Day, and the origin story of the Superman from John Henry Irons's unnamed Earth. By the sixth issue, the Superman from Irons' unnamed Earth was used by Magog to help attack Earth-Prime's heroes while Earth-Prime's Superman was seen in the final story with the Justice League.

See also
 Superman and Lois Lane, general information on the fictional couple
 Superman: Lois and Clark, the comic book series

References

External links
 
 Superman & Lois at DC Comics

Superman & Lois
2021 American television series debuts
2020s American drama television series
2020s American science fiction television series
American superhero television series
American action television series
American television spin-offs
English-language television shows
Serial drama television series
Television duos
Television productions postponed due to the COVID-19 pandemic
Television series about teenagers
Television series about brothers
Television series about families
Television series about parallel universes
Television series by Warner Bros. Television Studios
Television series created by Greg Berlanti
Television shows based on DC Comics
Television shows filmed in British Columbia
Television shows filmed in Vancouver
Television shows set in Kansas
Superman television series
The CW original programming